Khot is a village in the Tatev Municipality of the Syunik Province in Armenia. On the cliffs below Khot are the ruins of Hin Khot (Old Khot), the previous location of the village until the 1970s.

Toponymy 
The village was previously known as Khotavan and Khovt.

Demographics

Population 
The National Statistical Service of the Republic of Armenia (ARMSTAT) reported its population as 1,079 in 2010, up from 890 at the 2001 census. In the 1823 survey of Karabakh, the population was reported to consist of 37 households, all Armenian.

Gallery

References 

Populated places in Syunik Province